Georg Michael Hanack (22 October 1931 – 6 November 2019) was a professor of chemistry at the University of Tübingen in Germany.

Life and career 
Hanack was born in Luckenwalde on 22 October 1931. From 1949 to 1954 he studied chemistry, philosophy and economics at the universities of Freiburg, Bonn and Tübingen, and obtained his Diplomchemiker degree in 1954. In 1957, he completed his thesis under the supervision of Walter Hückel on "Solvolyse der Toluolsulfonate der stereoisomeren cis-alpha-Hydrindanole und Beiträge zur Messmethodik" (Solvolysis of toluenesulfonates of stereoisomeric cis-alpha-hydrindanoles and contributions to the methodology of kinetic measurements).

After being an assistant to Hückel from 1957 to 1958, Hanack conducted his own research on topics such as organofluorine chemistry, organic chemistry and stereochemistry. After his habilitation in 1961, he was granted the title Privatdozent when he was only 31 years old, at that time one of the youngest Privatdozenten in Germany. He was promoted to Professor extraordinarius at the University of Tübingen in 1968 and was offered the chair as professor of organic chemistry and head of the department at the Saarland University in 1970. In April 1975 he returned to the University of Tübingen as professor of organic chemistry, succeeding Eugen Müller. He was there also dean of the Faculty of Chemistry and Pharmacy from 1981 to 1983, and head of the Department of Chemistry from 1995 to 2001. From 2001 to 2019 he was Professor emeritus and continued his research work.

Research fields 
Hanack researched:
 Organic fluorine compounds, perfluorinated pyrethroids
 Stereochemistry, conformational analysis
 Organic reaction mechanisms, chemistry of vinyl and phenyl cations
 Synthesis of macroheterocyclic transition metal complexes (such as phthalocyanines) as intrinsic organic conductors (“shish-kebab“ polymers) 
 Sompounds with magnetic and non-linear optical properties

Selected publications 
 Fluorverbindungen der Terpenreihe: Reaktionen des Fluorwasserstoffs mit Doppelbindungen und Dreiringen, Tübingen, 1962
 
  online at Elsevier
 Michael Hanack, Siegmar Roth, Hermann Schier: Science and Technology of Synthetic Metals, 1991

Working group 
In his function as doctoral advisor, he had more than 230 doctoral students in addition to many postdoctoral students and guest researchers who studied in his laboratory.

Editorial work 
 1982–2003: Editorial Board of Houben-Weyl Methods of Organic Chemistry (Thieme Medical Publishers)
 1985–1998: Editorial Advisory Board of Synthesis (journal) (Thieme Medical Publishers)
 1999–2008: Honorary Advisory Board of Synthesis (journal) (Thieme Medical Publishers)
 2004–2008: Editorial Board of Synthetic Metals (Elsevier)
 since 1997: Editorial Board of Journal of Porphyrins and Phthalocyanines (John Wiley & Sons, World Scientific)

References

External links

 Homepage Working Group of Professor Hanack
 Literature list at ResearchGate

1931 births
2019 deaths
20th-century German chemists
Academic staff of the University of Tübingen
21st-century German chemists